Uganda competed in the 2008 Summer Olympics held in Beijing, People's Republic of China from August 8 to August 24, 2008. Uganda sent a delegation of eleven competitors, who took part in four sports.

Athletics

The following athletes have secured participation in the Beijing Games.

Men

Women

Key
Note–Ranks given for track events are within the athlete's heat only
Q = Qualified for the next round
q = Qualified for the next round as a fastest loser or, in field events, by position without achieving the qualifying target
NR = National record
N/A = Round not applicable for the event
Bye = Athlete not required to compete in round

Badminton

Boxing

Uganda qualified one boxer for the Olympic boxing tournament. Ronald Serugo earned Africa's last spot in the light flyweight class, at the second African qualifying tournament.

Swimming

Men

Women

Weightlifting

Mubarak Kivumbi was eliminated due to being overweight, at the time he was weighing 58 kg, although some reports state Kivumbi acknowledged he went to the event as a tourist and not a competitor.

See also
 Uganda at the 2008 Summer Paralympics

References

Nations at the 2008 Summer Olympics
2008
Summer Olympics